Jewson is one of the largest chains of British general builders' merchants, selling to small and medium building contractors. The chain comprises around 600 branches located all across Great Britain. Jewson is part of Denmark's STARK Group.

History 

George Jewson bought a business in Earith in 1836 to trade goods in the Huntingdonshire Fens of East Anglia. His son John Wilson Jewson (b. 1817) had 13 children: the eldest, George, at the time working with a timber merchant in Norwich, suggested expansion there.

John Jewson bought a house in Colegate in Norwich in 1868, and he moved there where he developed a successful timber, coal and builders' merchant business. The family played a role in civic service in Norwich and Norfolk.

Jewson, as part of the Meyer group, was acquired by the French conglomerate Saint-Gobain in April 2000.

In October 2001, Worldwide Business Information and Market Reports stated that "Having undergone a period of major consolidation, the builders' merchants market is now dominated by Jewson Ltd (owned by Saint-Gobain Building Distribution Ltd), Wolseley and Travis Perkins... These top three companies each have total sales of over £1bn."

In December 2022, Saint-Gobain announced it was selling Jewson to Denmark's STARK Group for £740m. The sale included Northern Ireland local brands Gibbs & Dandy and JP Corry, specialist brands Jewson Civil Frazer and Minster, and International Timber. The sale was completed in early 2023, when STARK appointed former Travis Perkins executive John Carter as CEO of the newly-formed Stark Building Materials UK Ltd.

Litigation 
On 15 May 2009, Jewson Ltd applied under s.69 (1) Companies Act 2006 for a change of name of Jewson's Drives Ltd which had been registered since 18 March 2009. Jewson Ltd argued that they enjoyed goodwill under the name "Jewson" since 1836 and that they were the United Kingdom's leading timber and builders' merchant. Jewson Ltd alleged that Jewson's Drives Ltd had been offering flagging, paving, fencing and related services and that their own customers had been misled by the respondent. However, as long as Jewson's Drives Ltd had actually been operating as a business and there was no evidence to show they only registered their name for the purpose of obtaining (valuable) consideration from Jewson Ltd or for the sake of obstructing their own registration of a name, then they could have a defence to the application. Jewson Ltd's application was struck out by the adjudicator.

References

External links 
 

British companies established in 1836
History of Norfolk
Wholesalers of the United Kingdom
Companies based in Coventry
Building materials companies of the United Kingdom
Saint-Gobain